is a railway station in the city of Fujioka, Gunma, Japan, operated by East Japan Railway Company (JR East).

Lines

Station layout
The station consists of one side platform serving a single track. The station is unattended.

Platforms

History
The station opened on 21 February 1961. With the privatization of the Japanese National Railways (JNR) on 1 April 1987, the station came under the control of JR East. The station became Suica-compatible from February 2002.

Passenger statistics
In fiscal 2013, the station was used by an average of 343 passengers daily (boarding passengers only).

Surrounding area
The station is located in a residential area in the northern part of Fujioka City and has a relatively large number of passengers for an unmanned station.

See also
 List of railway stations in Japan

References

External links

 JR East Station information 

Railway stations in Japan opened in 1961
Stations of East Japan Railway Company
Railway stations in Gunma Prefecture
Hachikō Line
Fujioka, Gunma